Mangpo Station is a subway station of the Suin-Bundang Line, the commuter subway line of Korail, the national railway of South Korea. It is the current southern terminus of the Suin-Bundang Line.

History 
The station was opened in December 2012, as part of the latest southward extension of the Bundang Line. In 2013, since the Bundang Line extended to Suwon station, it hasn't been a terminal station. After the Suin Line and the Bundang Line connected and start service together, it became a station of Suin-Bundang Line.

Seoul Metropolitan Subway stations
Railway stations opened in 2012
Metro stations in Suwon